Bentley is a census-designated place located in the eastern portion of Norwalk Township in Pottawattamie County in the state of Iowa, United States. As of the 2010 census the population was 118.

Demographics

References

Unincorporated communities in Pottawattamie County, Iowa
Unincorporated communities in Iowa
Census-designated places in Pottawattamie County, Iowa